The Juno Awards of 1982, representing Canadian music industry achievements of the previous year, were awarded on 14 April 1982 in Toronto at a ceremony hosted by Burton Cummings at the Harbour Castle Hilton Convention Centre in the Grand Metropolitan Ballroom.

The biggest winner this year was Loverboy with a record six awards in various categories including Group, Album and Single of the Year.  To date this record number of wins in a single Juno year still stands.

Awards ceremony
The original plan for the 1982 ceremonies was to have David Steinberg in Toronto, while Burton Cummings would co-host the broadcast live from the Commodore Ballroom in Vancouver, British Columbia. Juno organisers CARAS cancelled that plan on 15 February citing fears of "fragmentation" of the ceremonies with a dual city hosting approach. This resulted in some talk of hosting the Junos in Vancouver for 1983 but this would not be accomplished until 1991.

CARAS scheduled a music industry conference with guest speakers author Alvin Toffler and producer Bob Ezrin prior to the Juno awards event in an attempt to expand on the occasion. This was cancelled due to lack of advance registrations but this situation did not affect plans for the Juno ceremonies themselves.

Tickets to the ceremonies were priced at $115 for people who were not members of Juno organisers CARAS, and $85 for members. All tickets to the ceremonies were reportedly sold.

Performers during the show included Rough Trade, Liona Boyd, Ronnie Hawkins and B.B. Gabor.  The comedic duo of Bob and Doug McKenzie presented the awards for "Most Promising Male Vocalist", "Most Promising Female Vocalist" and "Group of the Year".

When Eddie Schwartz went to the podium to give his acceptance speech for the "Most Promising Male Vocalist" award he took a big drink of beer on live TV.  Afterwards two Royal Canadian Mounted Police officers approached Schwartz and reprimanded him, telling him that was illegal before finally releasing him back into the show.

A clean cut Neil Young dressed in a tuxedo accepted his "Canadian Music Hall of Fame" award with a very short speech acknowledging his family and that he was "proud to be a Canadian".  He would expand on his thoughts on the award and the current state of the Canadian music scene in a post-Juno Awards show broadcast on CBC following the main ceremonies.

The Juno Awards television broadcast on CBC set a new record with an estimated 2,170,000 viewers.

Nominees and winners
Most nominations were announced 28 February 1982, with certain nominations in classical, jazz and album graphics categories announced 12 March 1982.

Performers Raffi and Sharon, Lois & Bram did not enter their albums for the Juno children's category, as they felt the Junos were about popularity rather than artistry.

Anne Murray continued her streak of absence despite winning two prime awards again this year.

A tie was issued this year for the "Recording Engineer of the Year" award, and Rush was nominated twice in the "Best Album Graphics" category for two of their albums.

Female Vocalist of the Year
Winner: Anne Murray

Other nominees:
 Carroll Baker
 Lisa Dal Bello
 Joni Mitchell
 Carole Pope

Male Vocalist of the Year
Winner: Bruce Cockburn

Other nominees:
 Burton Cummings
 Gordon Lightfoot
 Gino Vannelli
 Neil Young

Most Promising Female Vocalist of the Year
Winner: Shari Ulrich

Other nominees:
 Salome Bey
 Terry Crawford
 Rita Johns
 Karen Silver

Most Promising Male Vocalist of the Year
Winner: Eddie Schwartz

Other nominees:
 B. B. Gabor
 Jim Byrnes
 Gary O'
 Peter Pringle

Group of the Year
Winner: Loverboy

Other nominees:
 April Wine
 Prism
 The Rovers
 Rush

Most Promising Group of the Year
Winner: Saga

Other nominees:
 Goddo
 The Kings
 Martha and the Muffins
 Red Rider

Composer of the Year
Winner: Mike Reno and Paul Dean, "Turn Me Loose" by Loverboy

Other nominees:
 Bill Henderson and Brian MacLeod, "My Girl" by Chilliwack
 Jack Lavin "Thirsty Ears" by Powder Blues Band
 Baron Longfellow, "Amour" (Longfellow was a pseudonym of Andy Kim)
 Kevan Staples and Carole Pope, "High School Confidential" by Carole Pope

Country Female Vocalist of the Year
Winner: Anne Murray

Other nominees:
 Carroll Baker
 Marie Bottrell
 Iris Larratt
 Laura Vinson

Country Male Vocalist of the Year
Winner: Ronnie Hawkins

Other nominees:
 Terry Carlisse
 Wilf Carter
 Harold MacIntyre
 Lee Marlow

Country Group or Duo of the Year
Winner: The Good Brothers

Other nominees:
 Family Brown
 The Mercey Brothers
 The Rovers
 Showdown

Folk Artist of the Year
Winner: Bruce Cockburn

Other nominees:
 Gordon Lightfoot
 Joni Mitchell
 The Rovers
 Valdy

Instrumental Artist of the Year
Winner: Liona Boyd

Other nominees:
 The Emeralds
 André Gagnon
 Hagood Hardy
 Frank Mills

Producer of the Year
Winner: Paul Dean / Bruce Fairbairn, "Working for the Weekend" and "When It's Over" by Loverboy

Other nominees:
 Kerry Crawford / Jon Goldsmith, "Take Off" by Bob & Doug McKenzie
 Fred Mollin, "Only The Lucky" and "Lodi" by Ronnie Hawkins
 Eddie Schwartz / David Tyson, "All Our Tomorrows" and "Tonight" by Eddie Schwartz
 Ian Thomas, "Hold On" and "Stringing a Line" by Ian Thomas

Recording Engineer of the Year
Winner (tied):
 Gary Gray, "Attitude" and "For Those Who Think Young" by Carole Pope and Rough Trade
 Bob Rock and Keith Stein, "When It's Over" and "It's Your Life" by Loverboy

Other nominees:
 David Greene, "Battlescar" and "Blue River Liquor Shine" by Max Webster
 Paul Northfield, "Tom Sawyer" and "Red Barchetta" by Rush
 Hayward Parrott, "Plaisir d'Amour" and "Prelude to Romance" by Frank Mills

Canadian Music Hall of Fame
Winner: Neil Young

Nominated and winning albums

Album of the Year
Winner: Loverboy, Loverboy

Other nominees:
 Exit...Stage Left, Rush
 The Great White North, Bob and Doug McKenzie
 Moving Pictures, Rush
 The Nature of the Beast, April Wine

Best Album Graphics
Winner: Hugh Syme and Deborah Samuel, Moving Pictures by Rush

Other nominees:
 Dave Buck, Footloose (self-titled)
 Richard Desmarais, Butler
 Dean Motter, But I'm Just a Kid (self-titled, featuring Mark Domenico, Larry Lacy and Ricky Yorke)
 Hugh Syme and Deborah Samuel, Exit...Stage Left by Rush

Best Children's Album
Winner: Inch By Inch, Sandra Beech

Other nominees:
 Big Bird and Oscar the Grouch, Camping in Canada (various artists)
 The Cats - Getting Ready for Christmas, The Children's Hour Production Orchestra
 Listen to the Children, Bob Schneider 
 The Polka Dot Pony, Fred Penner

Best Classical Album of the Year
Winner: Ravel: Daphnis Et Chloe (Complete Ballet), Orchestre symphonique de Montreal, Charles Dutoit Conductor

Other nominees:
 Mozart's Serenade for 12 Winds and Double Bass, Toronto Chamber Winds
 Rodrigo's Concerto de Aranjuez and Fantasia Para Un Gentilhombre, Orchestre symphonique de Montreal, Charles Dutoit - Conductor
 Rossini-Respighi's La Boutique Fantastique, Toronto Symphony Orchestra
 York Winds (woodwind quintets), York Winds

International Album of the Year
Winner: Double Fantasy, John Lennon

Other nominees:
 Crimes of Passion, Pat Benatar
 Guilty, Barbra Streisand
 Hi Infidelity, REO Speedwagon
 Stars on Long Play, Stars on 45

Best Jazz Album
Winner: The Brass Connection, The Brass Connection

Other nominees:
 Au Privave, Wray Downes and Dave Young
 Clear Vision, Joe Sealy
 Jump Street, Peter Leitch
 Live in Digital, Rob McConnell and the Boss Brass

Comedy Album of the Year
Winner: The Great White North, Bob & Doug McKenzie

Other nominees:
 An Evening With Stephen Leacock, John Stark
 Charlie Farquharson's Bible Stories, Don Harron
 It's Not the Heat, It's the Humility, Ted Woloshyn

Nominated and winning releases

Best Selling Single
Winner: "Turn Me Loose", Loverboy

Other nominees:
 "Amour" by Baron Longfellow
 "High School Confidential" by Rough Trade
 "My Girl" by Chilliwack
 "Thirsty Ears" by Powder Blues

International Single of the Year
Winner: "Bette Davis Eyes", Kim Carnes

Other nominees:
 "Celebration", Kool & the Gang
 "Endless Love", Diana Ross and Lionel Richie
 "Stars on 45", Stars on 45
 "The Tide Is High", Blondie

References

Bibliography
 Krewen, Nick. (2010). Music from far and wide: Celebrating 40 years of the Juno Awards. Key Porter Books Limited, Toronto.

External links
Juno Awards site

1982
1982 music awards
1982 in Canadian music